Tshwane University of Technology (TUT) is a higher education institution in South Africa that came into being through a merger of three technikons — Technikon Northern Gauteng, Technikon North-West and Technikon Pretoria.

As the number of students registering annually grows rapidly, records show that Tshwane University of Technology caters for approximately more than 60,000 students and it has become the largest residential higher education institution in South Africa.

Campuses 

The university occupies eight campuses: Pretoria, Soshanguve, Ga-Rankuwa, Witbank (eMalahleni), Mbombela (Nelspruit) and Polokwane. Two faculties, namely the Faculties of Science and The Arts, have dedicated campuses in the Pretoria city centre.

Student enrollment 
There were 88,078 students enrolled for the year 2012 at the Tshwane University of Technology. It was estimated, for the year 2014, that the number of first year student applications the university received  were around 80,000. Tshwane University of Technology predominantly provides vocational qualifications in the form of three-year diplomas. Additional options exist in the form of advanced diplomas, postgraduate and masters and doctoral degrees. These qualifications are offered through the following faculties:
 Faculty of Arts and Design
 Faculty of Science
 Faculty of Engineering and the Built Environment
 Faculty of Information and Communication Technology (ICT)
 Faculty of Humanities
 Faculty of Economics and Finance
 Faculty of Management Sciences (including Business School)

Ranking

In 2010 Webometrics ranked the university the 15th best in South Africa and 5662th in the world. In 2018, the university ranked ninth best university in South Africa

The United Nations Educational, Scientific and Cultural Organisation (UNESCO) ranks the university's Department of Journalism as one of twelve Potential Centres of Excellence in Journalism Training in Africa.

See also
List of universities in South Africa
List of post secondary institutions in South Africa

References

External links
Tshwane University of Technology
About Tshwane University of Technology, TUT
About Tshwane University of Technology - Section Staff members

 
Public universities in South Africa
Technical universities and colleges
Universities in Gauteng
Universities in North West (South African province)
Universities in Limpopo
Universities in Mpumalanga
Schools in Pretoria
Educational institutions established in 2004
2004 establishments in South Africa
Science and technology in South Africa